Novak may refer to: 
 Novak, surname and given name
 Novak, Centar Župa, village in Republic of Macedonia
 Novak Electronics, manufacturer of radio control electronic equipment
 Novak v. City of Parma, case regarding retaliatory prosecution

See also
 Novac (disambiguation)
 Novaković, a surname
 Novakovići, a village in Republika Srpska, Bosnia and Herzegovina
 Novakovtsi, a village in Bulgaria
 Novakovo, Varna Province, a village in Bulgaria